Alcantarea roberto-kautskyi is a plant species in the genus Alcantarea. This species is endemic to Brazil.

References

roberto-kautskyi
Flora of Brazil